Platyxythrius is a genus of beetles in the family Carabidae, containing the following species:

 Platyxythrius bertrandi (Straneo, 1951)
 Platyxythrius cavicola (Straneo in Basilewsky & Straneo, 1950)
 Platyxythrius clarkei Straneo, 1979
 Platyxythrius contractus (Straneo, 1941)
 Platyxythrius gigas (Straneo, 1952)
 Platyxythrius insularis Straneo, 1956
 Platyxythrius jeanneli (Straneo, 1942)
 Platyxythrius laevicollis (Burgeon, 1935)
 Platyxythrius latiusculus (Straneo, 1952)
 Platyxythrius luluanus (Straneo, 1939)
 Platyxythrius major (Straneo, 1941)
 Platyxythrius marginalis Straneo, 1956
 Platyxythrius parumpunctatus (Straneo, 1941)
 Platyxythrius pradieri (Chaudoir, 1872)
 Platyxythrius robustus (Straneo, 1941)
 Platyxythrius sinuaticollis (Straneo, 1952)
 Platyxythrius subrobustus (Straneo, 1952)
 Platyxythrius usambarensis (Straneo, 1942)
 Platyxythrius vanmoli (Straneo, 1951)
 Platyxythrius westermanni (Chaudoir, 1872)

References

Pterostichinae